In physics, a symmetry of a physical system is a physical or mathematical feature of the system (observed or intrinsic) that is preserved or remains unchanged under some transformation.

A family of particular transformations may be continuous (such as rotation of a circle) or discrete (e.g., reflection of a bilaterally symmetric figure, or rotation of a regular polygon). Continuous and discrete transformations give rise to corresponding types of symmetries. Continuous symmetries can be described by Lie groups while discrete symmetries are described by finite groups (see Symmetry group).

These two concepts, Lie and finite groups, are the foundation for the fundamental theories of modern physics. Symmetries are frequently amenable to mathematical formulations such as group representations and can, in addition, be exploited to simplify many problems.

Arguably the most important example of a symmetry in physics is that the speed of light has the same value in all frames of reference, which is described in special relativity by a group of transformations of the spacetime known as the Poincaré group. Another important example is the invariance of the form of physical laws under arbitrary differentiable coordinate transformations, which is an important idea in general relativity.

As a kind of invariance 
Invariance is specified mathematically by transformations that leave some property (e.g. quantity) unchanged. This idea can apply to basic real-world observations. For example, temperature may be homogeneous throughout a room. Since the temperature does not depend on the position of an observer within the room,  we say that the temperature is invariant under a shift in an observer's position within the room.

Similarly, a uniform sphere rotated about its center will appear exactly as it did before the rotation. The sphere is said to exhibit spherical symmetry. A rotation about any axis of the sphere will preserve how the sphere "looks".

Invariance in force 
The above ideas lead to the useful idea of invariance when discussing observed physical symmetry; this can be applied to symmetries in forces as well.

For example, an electric field due to an electrically charged wire of infinite length is said to exhibit cylindrical symmetry, because the electric field strength at a given distance r from the wire will have the same magnitude at each point on the surface of a cylinder (whose axis is the wire) with radius r. Rotating the wire about its own axis does not change its position or charge density, hence it will preserve the field. The field strength at a rotated position is the same. This is not true in general for an arbitrary system of charges.

The total kinetic energy is preserved under a reflection in the y-axis.

The last example above illustrates another way of expressing symmetries, namely through the equations that describe some aspect of the physical system. The above example shows that the total kinetic energy will be the same if v1 and v2 are interchanged.

Local and global 
Symmetries may be broadly classified as global or local. A global symmetry is one that keeps a property invariant for a transformation that is applied simultaneously at all points of spacetime, whereas a local symmetry is one that keeps a property invariant when a possibly different symmetry transformation is applied at each point of spacetime; specifically a local symmetry transformation is parameterised by the spacetime co-ordinates, whereas a global symmetry is not. This implies that a global symmetry is also a local symmetry. Local symmetries play an important role in physics as they form the basis for gauge theories.

Continuous 
The two examples of rotational symmetry described above – spherical and cylindrical – are each instances of continuous symmetry. These are characterised by invariance following a continuous change in the geometry of the system. For example, the wire may be rotated through any angle about its axis and the field strength will be the same on a given cylinder. Mathematically, continuous symmetries are described by transformations that change continuously as a function of their parameterization. An important subclass of continuous symmetries in physics are spacetime symmetries.

Spacetime 

Continuous spacetime symmetries are symmetries involving transformations of space and time. These may be further classified as spatial symmetries, involving only the spatial geometry associated with a physical system; temporal symmetries, involving only changes in time; or spatio-temporal symmetries, involving changes in both space and time.

For example, in classical mechanics, a particle solely acted upon by gravity will have gravitational potential energy mgh when suspended from a height h above the Earth's surface. Assuming no change in the height of the particle, this will be the total gravitational potential energy of the particle at all times.
 Spatial translation: These spatial symmetries are represented by transformations of the form  and describe those situations where a property of the system does not change with a continuous change in location. For example, the temperature in a room may be independent of where the thermometer is located in the room.
 Spatial rotation: These spatial symmetries are classified as proper rotations and improper rotations. The former are just the 'ordinary' rotations; mathematically, they are represented by square matrices with unit determinant. The latter are represented by square matrices with determinant −1 and consist of a proper rotation combined with a spatial reflection (inversion). For example, a sphere has proper rotational symmetry. Other types of spatial rotations are described in the article Rotation symmetry.
 Poincaré transformations: These are spatio-temporal symmetries which preserve distances in Minkowski spacetime, i.e. they are isometries of Minkowski space. They are studied primarily in special relativity. Those isometries that leave the origin fixed are called Lorentz transformations and give rise to the symmetry known as Lorentz covariance.
 Projective symmetries: These are spatio-temporal symmetries which preserve the geodesic structure of spacetime. They may be defined on any smooth manifold, but find many applications in the study of exact solutions in general relativity.
 Inversion transformations: These are spatio-temporal symmetries which generalise Poincaré transformations to include other conformal one-to-one transformations on the space-time coordinates. Lengths are not invariant under inversion transformations but there is a cross-ratio on four points that is invariant.

Mathematically, spacetime symmetries are usually described by smooth vector fields on a smooth manifold. The underlying local diffeomorphisms associated with the vector fields correspond more directly to the physical symmetries, but the vector fields themselves are more often used when classifying the symmetries of the physical system.

Some of the most important vector fields are Killing vector fields which are those spacetime symmetries that preserve the underlying metric structure of a manifold. In rough terms, Killing vector fields preserve the distance between any two points of the manifold and often go by the name of isometries.

Discrete 

A discrete symmetry is a symmetry that describes non-continuous changes in a system. For example, a square possesses discrete rotational symmetry, as only rotations by multiples of right angles will preserve the square's original appearance. Discrete symmetries sometimes involve some type of 'swapping', these swaps usually being called reflections or interchanges.

 Time reversal: Many laws of physics describe real phenomena when the direction of time is reversed. Mathematically, this is represented by the transformation, . This may be illustrated by recording the motion of an object thrown up vertically (neglecting air resistance) and then playing it back. The object will follow the same parabolic trajectory through the air, whether the recording is played normally or in reverse. Thus, position is symmetric with respect to the instant that the object is at its maximum height.
 Spatial inversion: These are represented by transformations of the form  and indicate an invariance property of a system when the coordinates are 'inverted'. Stated another way, these are symmetries between a certain object and its mirror image.
Glide reflection: These are represented by a composition of a translation and a reflection. These symmetries occur in some crystals and in some planar symmetries, known as wallpaper symmetries.

C, P, and T 

The Standard Model of particle physics has three related natural near-symmetries. These state that the universe in which we live should be indistinguishable from one where a certain type of change is introduced.

C-symmetry (charge symmetry), a universe where every particle is replaced with its antiparticle
P-symmetry (parity symmetry), a universe where everything is mirrored along the three physical axes. This excludes weak interactions as demonstrated by Chien-Shiung Wu.

T-symmetry (time reversal symmetry), a universe where the direction of time is reversed. T-symmetry is counterintuitive (the future and the past are not symmetrical) but explained by the fact that the Standard Model describes local properties, not global ones like entropy. To properly reverse the direction of time, one would have to put the Big Bang and the resulting low-entropy state in the "future". Since we perceive the "past" ("future") as having lower (higher) entropy than the present, the inhabitants of this hypothetical time-reversed universe would perceive the future in the same way as we perceive the past, and vice versa.

These symmetries are near-symmetries because each is broken in the present-day universe. However, the Standard Model predicts that the combination of the three (that is, the simultaneous application of all three transformations) must be a symmetry, called CPT symmetry. CP violation, the violation of the combination of C- and P-symmetry, is necessary for the presence of significant amounts of baryonic matter in the universe. CP violation is a fruitful area of current research in particle physics.

Supersymmetry 

A type of symmetry known as supersymmetry has been used to try to make theoretical advances in the Standard Model. Supersymmetry is based on the idea that there is another physical symmetry beyond those already developed in the Standard Model, specifically a symmetry between bosons and fermions. Supersymmetry asserts that each type of boson has, as a supersymmetric partner, a fermion, called a superpartner, and vice versa. Supersymmetry has not yet been experimentally verified: no known particle has the correct properties to be a superpartner of any other known particle. Currently LHC is preparing for a run which tests supersymmetry.

Mathematics of physical symmetry 

The transformations describing physical symmetries typically form a mathematical group. Group theory is an important area of mathematics for physicists.

Continuous symmetries are specified mathematically by continuous groups (called Lie groups). Many physical symmetries are isometries and are specified by symmetry groups. Sometimes this term is used for more general types of symmetries. The set of all proper rotations (about any angle) through any axis of a sphere form a Lie group called the special orthogonal group SO(3). (The '3' refers to the three-dimensional space of an ordinary sphere.) Thus, the symmetry group of the sphere with proper rotations is SO(3). Any rotation preserves distances on the surface of the ball. The set of all Lorentz transformations form a group called the Lorentz group (this may be generalised to the Poincaré group).

Discrete groups describe discrete symmetries. For example, the symmetries of an equilateral triangle are characterized by the symmetric group S.

A type of physical theory based on local symmetries is called a gauge theory and the symmetries natural to such a theory are called gauge symmetries. Gauge symmetries in the Standard Model, used to describe three of the fundamental interactions, are based on the  SU(3) × SU(2) × U(1) group. (Roughly speaking, the symmetries of the SU(3) group describe the strong force, the SU(2) group describes the weak interaction and the U(1) group describes the electromagnetic force.)

Also, the reduction by symmetry of the energy functional under the action by a group and spontaneous symmetry breaking of transformations of symmetric groups appear to elucidate topics in particle physics (for example, the unification of electromagnetism and the weak force in physical cosmology).

Conservation laws and symmetry 

The symmetry properties of a physical system are intimately related to the conservation laws characterizing that system. Noether's theorem gives a precise description of this relation. The theorem states that each continuous symmetry of a physical system implies that some physical property of that system is conserved. Conversely, each conserved quantity has a corresponding symmetry. For example, spatial translation symmetry (i.e. homogeneity of space) gives rise to conservation of (linear) momentum, and temporal translation symmetry (i.e. homogeneity of time) gives rise to conservation of energy.

The following table summarizes some fundamental symmetries and the associated conserved quantity.

Mathematics 
Continuous symmetries in physics preserve transformations. One can specify a symmetry by showing how a very small transformation affects various particle fields. The commutator of two of these infinitesimal  transformations are equivalent to a third infinitesimal transformation of the same kind hence they form a Lie algebra.

A general coordinate transformation described as the general field  (also known as a diffeomorphism) has the infinitesimal effect on a scalar , spinor  or vector field  that can be expressed (using the Einstein summation convention):

Without gravity only the Poincaré symmetries are preserved which restricts  to be of the form:

where M is an antisymmetric matrix (giving the Lorentz and rotational symmetries) and P is a general vector (giving the translational symmetries). Other symmetries affect multiple fields simultaneously. For example, local gauge transformations apply to both a vector and spinor field:

where  are generators of a particular Lie group. So far the transformations on the right have only included fields of the same type. Supersymmetries are defined according to how the mix fields of different types.

Another symmetry which is part of some theories of physics and not in others is scale invariance which involve Weyl transformations of the following kind:

If the fields have this symmetry then it can be shown that the field theory is almost certainly conformally invariant also. This means that in the absence of gravity h(x) would restricted to the form:

with D generating scale transformations and K generating special conformal transformations. For example,  super-Yang–Mills theory has this symmetry while general relativity doesn't although other theories of gravity such as conformal gravity do. The 'action' of a field theory is an invariant under all the symmetries of the theory. Much of modern theoretical physics is to do with speculating on the various symmetries the Universe may have and finding the invariants to construct field theories as models.

In string theories, since a string can be decomposed into an infinite number of particle fields, the symmetries on the string world sheet is equivalent to special transformations which mix an infinite number of fields.

See also 

Conserved current & Charge
Coordinate-free
Covariance and contravariance
Fictitious force
Galilean invariance
Principle of covariance
General covariance
Harmonic coordinate condition
Inertial frame of reference
List of mathematical topics in relativity
Standard Model (mathematical formulation)
Wheeler–Feynman absorber theory

References

General readers 

 Chapter 12 is a gentle introduction to symmetry, invariance, and conservation laws.

Technical readers 

 Address to the 2002 meeting of the Philosophy of Science Association.

External links 
The Feynman Lectures on Physics Vol. I Ch. 52: Symmetry in Physical Laws
Stanford Encyclopedia of Philosophy: "Symmetry"—by K. Brading and E. Castellani.
Pedagogic Aids to Quantum Field Theory Click on link to Chapter 6: Symmetry, Invariance, and Conservation for a simplified, step-by-step introduction to symmetry in physics.

Concepts in physics
Conservation laws
Diffeomorphisms
Differential geometry
Symmetry